The Road From Coorain is the film adaptation of Jill Ker Conway's memoir of the same name. It was awarded an AFI award, Best Telefeature, Mini Series or Short Run Series in 2002.

Cast
Juliet Stevenson as Eve
Richard Roxburgh as Bill
Katherine Slattery as Jill (adult)
Tim Guinee as Alec
John Howard as Angus
Bernard Curry as Bob
Alex Tomasetti as Jill (teenage)
Alexandra Galwey as Jill (child)

Reception 
Reviews were very positive.

In response to requests for interviews, Conway's attorney responded that, "Ms Conway does not wish to be associated in any manner with the film."  According to the filmmaker, Penny Chapman,"Ker Conway appeared especially displeased with a sex scene in the film because she believed it: 'turns a lyrical affair into a Peyton Place soap opera of lust'."

References

External links
The Road From Coorain

2002 television films
2002 films
Australian drama television films
Television films based on books